The International Mass Spectrometry Foundation (IMSF) is a non-profit scientific organization in the field of mass spectrometry.  It operates the International Mass Spectrometry Society, which consists of 37 member societies and sponsors the International Mass Spectrometry Conference that is held once every two years.

Aims
The foundation has four aims: 
 organizing international conferences and workshops in mass spectrometry
 improving mass spectrometry education
 standardizing terminology in the field
 aiding in the dissemination of mass spectrometry through publications

Conferences
Before the formation of the IMSF, the first International Mass Spectrometry Conference was held in London in 1958 and 41 papers were presented. Since then, conferences were held every three years until 2012, and every two years since. Conference proceedings are published in a book series, Advances in Mass Spectrometry, which is the oldest continuous series of publications in mass spectrometry. The International Mass Spectrometry Society evolved from this series of International Mass Spectrometry Conferences. The IMSF was officially registered in the Netherlands in 1998 following an agreement at the 1994 conference.

Past meetings were held in these locations:

Awards
The society sponsors several awards including the Curt Brunnée Award for achievements in instrumentation by a scientist under 45 years of age, the Thomson Medal Award for achievements in mass spectrometry, as well as travel awards and student paper awards:

Curt Brunnée Award winners:

See also
 American Society for Mass Spectrometry
 British Mass Spectrometry Society
 Canadian Society for Mass Spectrometry
 List of female mass spectrometrists

References

External links

Chemistry societies
Mass spectrometry
Organisations based in Gelderland
Scientific organisations based in the Netherlands